Ama-arhus (also Nin-amaʾarḫuššu; "(lady) compassionate mother") was a sparsely attested Mesopotamian goddess.

She was among the deities introduced to the pantheon of Uruk in the Hellenistic period, alongside the likes of Amasagnudi and Šarrāḫītu. 

Her name is explained as a title of the medicine goddess Gula in one text. It has been proposed that the presence of Ama-Arhus in late theophoric names from Uruk explains why Gula appears to not be attested in them, despite being worshiped in the city. It is possible that she was merely viewed as her manifestation or synonym, as she is not otherwise attested in Uruk.

References

Bibliography

Mesopotamian goddesses
Medicine goddesses